Wat Tha Phra is one of the two khwaeng (subdistrict) of Bangkok Yai District, Bangkok's Thonburi side (left side of Chao Phraya River).

History
Its name after a local temple, Wat Tha Phra, an ancient private temple. There is no obvious evidence of when temple was built or who built the place. It is only known that formerly the temple was called "Wat Ko" (วัดเกาะ), which means "island temple" since in those days it was surrounded by three waterways, namely Khlong Mon, Khlong Bangkok Yai, and Chao Phraya River. Later, its name was changed to "Wat Tha Phra" as today, because Luang Pho Kesorn, the sacred Buddha image of Ayutthaya period, floated along the water and reached the temple, hence the name Wat Tha Phra, which means "Buddha pier temple".

Wat Tha Phra sites on the right side of Charan Sanit Wong Road not far from Tha Phra Intersection and Tha Phra MRT Station.

Geography
The area is surrounded by canals on all parts except on the east part with Itsaraphap Road serves as boundary line between Wat Tha Phra and Wat Arun Subdistricts.

Neighbouring subdistricts are (from the north clockwise): Bang Khun Si and Ban Chang Lo of Bangkok Noi District (across Khlong Mon), Wat Arun in its district, Hiran Ruchi, Bang Yi Ruea and Talat Phlu of Thon Buri District (across Khlong Bangkok Yai), Pak Khlong Phasi Charoen  and Khuha Sawan of Phasi Charoen District (across Khlong Bangkok Yai).

Soi Phet Kasem  4, also known as Soi Wat Sangkrachai is a shortcut to Soi Itsaraphap 21 on Itsaraphap Road near the foot of Charoenphat Bridge and Kudi Charoenphat.

Places

Important places
Bangkok Yai District Office
Tha Phra MRT Station
Tha Phra Police Station
The Kingdom of Lesotho Consulate
Luang Ritthinarongron House Museum
Naowachamnian Bridge (shares with Bang Yi Ruea Subdistrict)
Bang Phai Bridge (shares with Pak Khlong Phasi Charoen Subdistrict)
Charoenphat Bridge (shares with Wat Arun, Wat Kanlaya and Hiran Ruchi Subdistricts)
Charan 13 MRT Station
Itsaraphap MRT Station (shares with Wat Arun Subdistrict)

Temples
Wat Tha Phra
Wat Diduat
Wat Chao Mun
Wat Pradu Chimphli
Wat Pradu Nai Songtham
Wat Sangkrachai
Wat Mai Piren
Wat Ratchasittharam
Plai Na Mosque and Cemetery

Schools and colleges
Wiboon Business Administration College
Bangkok Commercial School
Siam Technological College
Sesawech Vidhaya School
Ritthinarongron School
Saiprasit Business Administration Technological
Saiprasit School
Prasart Wittaya Anuchon School
Wat Pradu Chimphli School

Transportation
Phet Kasem Road (Thailand Route 4)
Charan Sanit Wong Road
Ratchadapisek Road
Itsaraphap Road

References

Bangkok Yai district
Subdistricts of Bangkok